Anarta decepta is a moth of the family Noctuidae. It was described by Augustus Radcliffe Grote in 1883 from Colorado and is found along the Pacific Coast of the United States and Canada. It was first discovered in Hawaii in light trap catches made in the Pearl Harbor area on Oahu in the autumn of 1947.

The wingspan is 28–29 mm.

External links

decepta
Moths of North America
Moths described in 1883